The Three Shires Fell Race is an annual Lake District fell race held in September, starting and finishing at the Three Shires Inn in Little Langdale. After an initial run along the valley, the route climbs steeply to Wetherlam, then down to Prison Band and up to the summit of Swirl How. The course then drops to the Three Shire Stone at the top of the Wrynose Pass, the meeting point of the historic counties of Cumberland, Lancashire and Westmorland. An ascent of Pike of Blisco follows, then the route drops to Blea Tarn before the final climb to Lingmoor Fell and descent to the finish.

History
The inaugural race was held in 1983. The leading organiser was Ian Stephenson of the Three Shires Inn, who was assisted by Selwyn Wright who later became the main organiser.

In 1984, the prizes were presented by Chris Brasher, the gold medallist in the 3000m steeplechase at the 1956 Olympic Games. Brasher also competed in that edition of the Three Shires but did not finish the race. A junior race was added to the event that year. In some later years, the junior races featured as age group championship races and participating runners included Rob Hope, Victoria Wilkinson and Rob Jebb.

The 1990 women's race was won by Mari Todd who was then only seventeen years old. She went on to win the English Fell Running Championships in 1997.

The Three Shires has been one of the counting races in the English Fell Running Championships, including the 1993 edition. In 1997 it was again an English Championships counter as well as a home international with England winning the team race, followed by Scotland and then Wales.

The Three Shires is one of the races in the Lakeland Classics Trophy series which was established in 2002.

Results
The male and female course records were both set in 1997, by Gavin Bland with a time of 1:45:08 and Mari Todd with 2:05:29. The men's record has not been approached since then, but Victoria Wilkinson was within thirty seconds of the women's record in 2016.

Ricky Lightfoot has the greatest number of wins amongst the men, with five between 2007 and 2016. Mari Todd and Vanessa Brindle (now Vanessa Peacock) have won the women's race the most times, with three victories each.

The winners have been as follows.

 Jeska was a transgender runner who competed as a woman. However, doubts were raised over whether she was eligible to compete as a woman and her results were declared null and void. Jeska excluded, the first woman in the 2010 race was Tracey Greenway in a time of 2:27:02.

References

Fell running competitions in Cumbria